Stepan Vasiliyevich Lopukhin (Russian: Степан Васильевич Лопухин; c. 1685 – 6 (17) July 1748; Selenginsk) was a Russian general, courtier and nobleman from the Lopukhin family. He became chamberlain in 1727 and a lieutenant general in 1741, as well as serving on the Admiralty Board from 1740 to 1741. He was the husband of Natalia Lopukhina and was arrested before the Lopukhina Affair.

Sources
 Лопухины // БРЭ. — М: Большая российская энциклопедия, 2011. — Т. 18. — С. 40. — 768 с. — 60 000 экз. — .

Stepan
1680s births
1748 deaths
Imperial Russian Army generals
18th-century people from the Russian Empire